is a train station in Kawanehon, Haibara District, Shizuoka Prefecture, Japan, operated by the Ōigawa Railway.

Lines

Station layout
The station has one side platforms serving a single track, with a small shelter on the platform for passengers. The station is unattended.

Station history
Okuōikojō Station was opened on October 2, 1990 when part of the Ikawa Line was re-routed to avoid the rising waters of the lake created by the Nagashima Dam. Located on a cliff next to the Okuōi Reservoir created by the Nagashima Dam, the station platform partially extends onto a bridge spanning the reservoir.

Passenger statistics
In fiscal 2017, the station was used by an average of 16 passengers daily (boarding passengers only).

Surrounding area
Nagashima Dam

In media 
The 3rd episode of the TV series "Tetsu Ota Michiko, 20,000 km" is dedicated to this station

Gallery

See also
 List of Railway Stations in Japan

References

External links

 Ōigawa Railway home page

Stations of Ōigawa Railway
Railway stations in Shizuoka Prefecture
Railway stations in Japan opened in 1990
Kawanehon, Shizuoka